The Monastery of St. Nicholas Anapausas is an Eastern Orthodox monastery that is part of the Meteora monastery complex in Thessaly, central Greece. It is situated at the top of a rocky precipice.

References

Nicholas Anapausas
Greek Orthodox monasteries in Greece
Christian monasteries established in the 16th century